Canaan Street Lake is a  water body located in Grafton County in western New Hampshire, United States, in the town of Canaan. It is part of the Mascoma River watershed, a tributary of the Connecticut River.

A peninsula on the north side of the lake is occupied by the Cardigan Mountain School. The west side of the lake is bordered by the Canaan Street Historic District.

See also

List of lakes in New Hampshire

References

Lakes of Grafton County, New Hampshire